Wessel Roux (born 18 October 1976) is a South African international rugby union prop who last played for CS Bourgoin-Jallieu in the Top 14. He has been capped 3 times for South Africa. He has also played for RC Toulonnais in the Top 14 and the Bulls in the Super 14.

Wessel earned over 100 caps with the Bulls.

He is currently the forward coach for the Blue Bull U19 and scrum coach for the Blue Bulls U21, Vodacom Cup side and Currie Cup.

Education
He studied at the University of Pretoria.

References

External links 
 
 
 

1976 births
Living people
Bulls (rugby union) players
Blue Bulls players
South African rugby union players
South Africa international rugby union players
University of Pretoria alumni
Rugby union props